The Kavala Imaret is a külliye (a type of Ottoman charitable foundation) founded by Muhammad Ali Pasha in the early 19th century, in what it was then the Ottoman Empire. The complex is located in the old town of Kavala, in the region of Eastern Macedonia and Thrace, Greece. Since 2004, the monument functions as a hotel. It is considered to be one of the greatest landmarks of Kavala, and among the most important Ottoman ones in Greece.

It was built in the old town of Kavala, on top of pre-existing Byzantine walls in the Panagia peninsula of the port. Its founder was Muhammad Ali, a Kavala native who later rose to be the de facto ruler of Egypt. It is a large complex, which consisted of madrasas, a mekteb (Quranic primary school), the imaret (soup kitchen), a mesjid (teaching area), a water tank and taps for washing, and several other facilities for the town's Muslim population.

History

Ottoman era 
The founder of the imaret was Kavala-born Muhammad Ali Pasha, who ordered the construction of the foundation as a "gift" to his birthplace in 1813. Built just below the fortifications in the heart of the old town of Kavala, the imaret supported the educational, social and religious needs of the Muslim population of Kavala. The English traveller George Frederick Abbott, who visited Kavala in 1901, described it as a "hybrid of school and kitchen."

Although dedicated to traditional Islamic curriculum and sciences, the kitchens accepted all students and travellers, irregardless of religion. It is one of the earliest examples of western-style school providing secular education in the Ottoman Empire, in accordance with Muhammad Ali's efforts for modernization.

It used to house rare editions of Ottoman, Turkish and Persian manuscripts, dating from the 12th century; it has been suggested that those were either stolen or destroyed, though it is also claimed that perhaps, following Greco-Turkish turmoil in the 1820s, the Egyptian community transferred them to Egypt instead. As time passed, the education and charity purposes of the imaret declined. It is known that the school continued to function until 1902, and the kitchen until 1923.

Greece 

The imaret, along with the rest of the town of Kavala, became part of modern Greece on June 26 1913, following the victory of the Balkan League against the Ottoman Empire in the Balkan wars.

Following the defeat of Greece in the 1919-1922 Greco-Turkish war and the exchange of populations between Greece and the newly founded republic of Turkey, several Greek refugees from Asia Minor arriving in Greece were housed in the imaret until as late as 1960s. In 1954, the imaret along with the house of Muhammad Ali were declared protected historical monuments, and recognized as Egyptian waqfs by the Greek state.

Following the departure of the last Greek refugees, the building fell into disarray. One of the courtyards was converted into a tavern, some cells were turned into storage areas, parts of the lead roofs were stripped down, as were the Ottoman crescents that decorated the domes. The building slowly experience decline, though its strong foundations would not let it collapse.

The most crucial decision to preserve and restore the imaret however was made by Kavala resident Anna Missirian in the mid 1990s, in spite of the enormous cost and difficulties she faced in procedure. Missirian leased the imaret from the Egyptian government, as it is still part of the Egyptian waqf property in Greece. After 22 months of intensive work the restoration was finished. Since 2004, the imaret has been operating as a hotel open to all visitors.

Architecture 

The imaret is a large structure, around 120 metres long and with an area of 4,200 square metres.

The roof of the imaret is an array of leaden domes. Soft curves and arches are also present everywhere else in the large complex: in all the bedrooms each courtyard, a polygonal-like curval rhytmn is the dominant style. The enclosed gardens also display a series of contiguous domes.

Externally, from the sea side, the imaret lies on top of the old Byzantine walls of Kavala. Although the building was built during the Ottoman Baroque era, where Western influence was popular in the East, it keeps unchanged the basic principles of this architecture.

The complex included a mekteb (elementary school), two madrasas (higher level colleges) and two dershane-masjids (praying halls). It has 61 rooms that used to accommodate for up to 300 students, and are now used as the suits of the hotel. It also housed two study halls, a library, and a printing press. In order to meet the religious and hygiene needs of its occupants, the imaret contained a praying hall, a hamam, a cistern and fountains.

The multiple columns are mostly made of brick and sometimes marble. Some capitals have floral motifs. The floors are either paved or made of marble slabs. Trees, plants and moving water, gardens in general, are a self-evident image in the courtyards of Muslim buildings.

For the religious needs of the community, the imaret housed a single-dome mosque, the Muhammad Ali Pasha Mosque, fittingly named after the founder of the building. The mosque is no longer open for worship.

Gallery

See also 

 Ottoman Greece
 Ottoman architecture
 Mihrişah Sultan Complex

References

External links 
 

Former mosques in Greece
Ottoman mosques in Greece
19th-century architecture in Greece
Buildings and structures in Kavala
Muhammad Ali of Egypt
Macedonia under the Ottoman Empire